The 12669 / 12670 Ganga Kaveri Express is a bi-weekly Express train service operated by Indian Railways, connecting Chennai in Southern India to Chhapra in Bihar. Inaugurated on 16 February 1977 by Kamalpati Tripathi, between Madras (now Chennai) and Varanasi, was terminating at Chennai Beach Station, from where MG Ganga Kaveri Express used to run to Rameswaram through the Kaveri river basin. From May 2, 2022 it will run with the new highly refurbished LHB coach.

Etymology
It is named after two Indian Rivers; Ganga (which flows in the holy city of Varanasi, also Chhapra) and Kaveri river (a River which flows in the Southern states of Karnataka and Tamil Nadu).

History
The Superfast of train number 139/140 started its service to Varanasi from Madras Beach station, from the opposite platform where an MG Ganga Kaveri Express used to run to Rameswaram since Chennai Beach–Chennai Egmore–Rameswaram line was still in metre gauge. Later the Superfast status was erased, made to terminate at Madras Central (now Chennai Central instead of Madras Beach (now Chennai Beach) as an Express and connection with Madras–Rameswaram Express removed and name changed from Ganga Kaveri Exp to Madras–Varanasi Express. Thus increased halts at some stations, converted from one-night to two-nights train, slowed down by more than 3 hours, Green and Yellow colored rakes withdrawn and AC sleeper service introduced. Later, in 90's Jaffer Sharief introduced the train which is running currently as Ganga Kaveri Express for the benefit of South Indian tourists, willing to travel to holy city of Varanasi. This train was extended to Chhapra in December 2006 despite a stiff opposition from the Local South Indians in Varanasi, who alleged that quota may be reduced for Varanasi bound passengers. Currently, this train is under criticism since the name of the train currently running wasn't suitable (because this train originates in Chennai not in Trichy where  Kaveri river is running and in Chennai only Coovum river is there and hence reason).Also passengers are requesting to change these old, rusting coaches(this train was running still with old ICF rakes for 40+ years) to new LHB rakes since this train is highly preferred for local tourist organisations and senior citizens following Hinduism for doing last rites such as Funeral ceremony and ceremonies to the deceased ancestors and also it is the only straight train from Chennai to Varanasi.

Route
The following are the major junctions en route: Gudur, Ongole, Khammam, Warangal, Ramagundam, Itarsi,  Ghazipur city and Ballia.

Traction

It is hauled by a Royapuram-based WAP-7 or Erode-based WAP-4 locomotive from Chennai Central to Itarsi Jn.. And then handing over to an Itarsi / Katni-based WDM-3A twins locomotive from Itarsi Jn. to Chhapra Jn., and vice versa.

Coach composition
The train runs with LHB coach. It has 1 AC First Class, 3 AC Two Tier, 2 AC Three Tier, 11 Sleeper class, 2 General Unreserved, 2 Luggage cum Generator Car and 1 pantry car (a total of 22 coaches).

It shares its rake with,

12691/12692 - Chennai Central - Sri Sathya Sai Prashanti Nilayam SSPN Weekly SF Express.

See also

Tamil Nadu Express
Sanghamithra Express
Bagmati Express
Manikarnika Express
List of named passenger trains of India
Indian Railways – Travel Coach types and their seating / berths

References

External links
 Ganga Kaveri Express at India Rail Info
 Ganga Kaveri Express at India Rail Info

Transport in Chennai
Transport in Chhapra
Named passenger trains of India
Railway services introduced in 1977
Express trains in India
Rail transport in Tamil Nadu
Rail transport in Andhra Pradesh
Rail transport in Telangana
Rail transport in Maharashtra
Rail transport in Madhya Pradesh
Rail transport in Uttar Pradesh
Rail transport in Bihar